Robert Edward Harold Crosbie (born 1886, 1950) was a high rank official in the Mandatory Palestine between 1921 and 1948 the end of the British Mandatory, except for the years 1926-1928 in which he was sent as a government secretary to the Transjordan region.

On the 15 of June, 1925 he was nominated as the assistant district commissioner for the Southern District and was highly involved in the life and administration of the local people.

After the 1929 Arab riots he help to introduced income tax to Palestine, in order to alleviating the burden on Arab peasants. 
For many years he resisted transferring the Jewish neighborhoods of dominantly Arab Jaffa to Tel Aviv, as this was considered by him to be a blow on the pride of the Arabs of Jaffa 

At age 61 he was retired from service to a suburb of London.

1886 births
1950 deaths
British people in Mandatory Palestine